is a 2010 Japanese remake of the 1990 American film Ghost. It is directed by Taro Otani and it stars Nanako Matsushima, Song Seung-heon, Mana Ashida and Kirin Kiki.

Plot

Nanami Hoshino, a wealthy entrepreneur, marries Korean potter Kim Jun-ho, and they both live a seemingly happy life. Then, one month after their marriage, Nanami is killed by a biker on her way home. This tragedy leaves Jun-ho completely devastated. At the hospital, Nanami's ghost arises from her body, and upon meeting a ghost child, she realizes that she is a ghost whose presence cannot be seen. She then realizes that her death was no coincidence and Jun-ho is in imminent danger. Unable to communicate with normal humans, Nanami seeks help from the elderly psychic Unten in hopes of saving Jun-ho's life.

Cast
 Nanako Matsushima as Nanami Hoshino (星野 七海 Hoshino Nanami)
 Song Seung-heon as Kim Jun-ho (キム・ジュノ Kimu Juno)
 Kirin Kiki as Unten (運天五月)
 Mana Ashida as the kid Ghost (少女のゴースト)
 Satoshi Hashimoto as Kuroda
 Sawa Suzuki as Miharu Kimijyo (上条未春 Kimijō Miharu)
 Kazuko Kurosawa
 Daisuke Miyagawa
 Yoichi Nukumizu
 Kyusaku Shimada

Production

Musc
Eiga.com reported on 1 September 2010 that the theme song of the film Ghost: Mouichido Dakishimetai will be the song , which is sung by singer Ken Hirai. This song was released as his 33rd single on 10 November 2010. Ken Hirai had previously provided theme songs for films like I Give My First Love to You and Ano Sora o Oboeteru.

References

External links
 
 
 

2010 films
South Korean drama films
2010s Japanese-language films
2010 romantic drama films
Japanese romantic drama films
Nippon TV films
Japanese ghost films
Paramount Pictures films
Shochiku films
Japanese romantic fantasy films
Japanese remakes of American films
Works by Miho Nakazono
Films scored by Michiru Ōshima
2010s Japanese films
2010s South Korean films